Weirather is a German surname that may refer to
 Harti Weirather (born 1958), Austrian alpine skier
 Tina Weirather (born 1989), Liechtenstein alpine skier

See also
 18680 Weirather, a main-belt asteroid  named after Sara Jo Weirather (born 1985)

German-language surnames